Colwellia demingiae is a psychrophilic Antarctic bacterial species with the ability to synthesize docosahexaenoic acid. It is nonpigmented, curved-rod-like in shape, exhibiting facultative anaerobic growth, and possessing an absolute requirement for sea water. Its type strain is ACAM 459T.
This bacteria is named after Jody Deming, a professor and researcher at University of Washington and her research mentor, Rita Colwell.

References

Further reading

Yumoto, Isao, ed. Cold-adapted Microorganisms. Horizon Scientific Press, 2013.
Brenner, Don J., et al. "Bergey's manual of systematic bacteriology, vol. 2."The Proteobacteria. East Lansing, USA 183 (2005).
Dworkin, Martin, and Stanley Falkow, eds. The Prokaryotes: Vol. 6: Proteobacteria: Gamma Subclass. Vol. 6. Springer, 2006.
Stan-Lotter, Helga, and Sergiu Fendrihan. Adaption of microbial life to environmental extremes. Springer Wien, New York, 2012.

External links

LPSN

Alteromonadales
Bacteria described in 1998